Tomislav Bralić (born 10 December 1968) is a Croatian singer of klapa music. He sings in the group, Klapa Intrade, and they are best known for their hit Croatio, iz duše te ljubim. They were on Dora 2009 and won the second place.

Discography 

 Lipa rič (1996)
 Dalmacijo lipa (2003)
 Karta ljubavi (2006)
 Ne damo te pismo naša (2009)

References 

Living people
20th-century Croatian male singers
1968 births
21st-century Croatian male singers